Killington Lane is a temporary terminus about  southwest of Woody Bay on the Lynton and Barnstaple Railway (L&B), the narrow gauge line that originally ran for  through Exmoor from Barnstaple to Lynton and Lynmouth in North Devon.

History

The L&B originally opened in 1898, and closed in 1935.

Killington Lane opened to passenger services on 27 May 2006, as the rebuilding continues southwards towards the former Halt at Parracombe.

The station has been built alongside rather than actually on the original formation. The adjacent cutting is partially filled in leading to Bridge 65, which, once rebuilt, would allow the line to be rebuilt under and beyond Killington Lane.

Design
The wooden platform shelter, similar in footprint to those used elsewhere on the original line (such as at Snapper) is, like the carriage shed at Woody Bay, intended to be transportable, so the station can be moved to each new railhead as the reconstruction continues.

Location
Killington Lane station is at:

External links
Killington Lane to Blackmoor Gate and Wistlandpound with Maps & Photos
Video footage of Killington Lane Station

Heritage railway stations in Devon
Railway stations in Great Britain opened in 2006
Lynton and Barnstaple Railway
Railway stations built for UK heritage railways